Malocampa puella is a moth of the family Notodontidae. It is found in Central America.

References

Moths described in 1908
Notodontidae